The Samsung Galaxy Mega 2 is an Android smartphone/tablet computer hybrid ("phablet" or "tablet phone") manufactured by Samsung and is the successor to the Samsung Galaxy Mega. It was released in September 2014.

Features 
The Samsung Galaxy Mega 2 has a display with a resolution of 720 x 1280, a Quad Core 1.7 GHz processor and an 8-megapixel camera. It has internal storage options of 8 GB or 16 GB (usable 5.34 or 12 GB, respectively), and has dual-SIM capability. The display includes Smart Stay, which utilises the front-facing cameras to track if the user is looking at the display, and powering off the display if they are not.

The device supports multiple windows (commonly referred to as ‘split screen’), with a home screen that is usable in portrait or landscape mode. Included in the phone's operating system is Samsung S Voice, a virtual assistant.

Hardware
The Galaxy Mega largely resembles the Galaxy S5, with the two sharing similar features. Users can customize the lock screen and quickly access settings from the drop-down notification bar. It includes Multi Window, which allows users to use multiple apps on the same screen, a feature that is enhanced with the phone's 6.0-inch LCD (720 x 1280) display.

The rear-facing 8-megapixel camera comes with shooting modes such as 

 HDR (Rich Tone) 
 Continuous Shot 
 Sports
 Beauty Face 
 Shot and More
 Virtual Tour
 Sound and Shot
 Night Mode  
 Panorama

Users can store additional music, photos and videos with up to 64 GB of expandable storage with an external microSD card. A 2,800mAh removable battery should allow the phone to run throughout the day on a single charge. The Galaxy Mega is powered by a Quad Core processor with 1.5 GB of RAM.

The motherboard of the Galaxy Mega 2 bears a similar design to that of the Samsung Galaxy S5, with a large sub-board housing the processor, SIM card and microSDXC card readers, front and rear-facing cameras, microphone assembly, and other components, located at the top of the device, connected to a smaller sub-board at the bottom housing the micro-USB port.

Design

The Galaxy Mega 2 measures 6.6 x 3.46 x 0.31 inches and it weighs 7.1 ounces. It utilizes a traditional IPS LCD screen. 

The Galaxy Mega 2 does not utilize a unibody design or proprietary screws, allowing it to be disassembled relatively easily using a standard Phillips No. 000 screwdriver for repairs.

Software 

The Samsung Galaxy Mega 2 runs Android version 4.4.2 skinned with Samsung's TouchWiz interface. Samsung's Multi-window Mode is the front and center feature of the device. 

Similar to other Galaxy phones, the lock screen can be customized with widgets and shortcuts. Seven customizable home screens are available to the user. 11 quick settings buttons in the notification drawer enable users to toggle features including Wi-Fi connectivity, Sound Mode, Ultra Power Saving and Power Saving.

Variants 
 SM-G750F  6.0-inch screen, 1.5 GHz CPU, 1.5 GB RAM, 16 GB built-in storage  LTE support  no dual SIM support  
 SM-G7508  6.0-inch screen, 1.2 GHz CPU, 1.5 GB RAM, 16 GB built-in storage  LTE support  no dual SIM support
 SM-G7508Q  6.0-inch screen, 1.2 GHz CPU, 1.5 GB RAM, 8 GB built-in storage  LTE support  dual SIM support
 SM-G750H  6.0-inch screen, 1.2 GHz CPU, 1.5 GB RAM, 8 GB built-in storage  no LTE support  dual SIM support
 SM-G750A  6.0-inch screen, 1.5 GHz CPU, 1.5 GB RAM, 16 GB built-in storage  LTE support   no dual SIM support

See also
 Samsung Galaxy Mega
 Samsung Galaxy S5
 Samsung Galaxy Note 3
 Samsung Galaxy Tab S (disambiguation)
 Samsung Galaxy S5 Mini
 Samsung Galaxy S6
 Samsung Galaxy S6 Edge

References

External links
 Samsung press release
 Video review by GSM Arena
 Samsung Galaxy Mega Phablet Debuts Information Week

Android (operating system) devices
Samsung mobile phones
Samsung Galaxy
Mobile phones introduced in 2013
Phablets